Aarhus United is a Danish women's handball club based in Aarhus. They play in Damehåndboldligaen, Denmark's premier women's handball league. Aarhus United was founded in 2017 and took over SK Aarhus's league license for the 2017-18 season.

Kits

Results 
Danish Cup
Bronze (1): 2017

Team

Current squad
Squad for the 2022–23 season

Goalkeepers
 12  Nora Persson
 16  Louise Bak Jensen
 86  Sabine Englert
Wingers 
LW
 15  Sophia Snogdal
 17  June Bøttger
RW
 9  Frederikke Hedegaard
 18  Mathilde Orkild
 22  Stine Holm
 24  Julie Redkjær
Pivots
 5  Katarina Viktoria Bjørnskau Berens
 6  Christina Hansen

Back players
LB
 2  Julie Liholt
 4  Thea Stankiewicz
 7  Emma Mogensen (c)
 8  Aia Raadshøj
CB
 3  Marielle Martinsen
 14  Anna Wierzba
 88  Mathilde Neesgaard
RB
 10  Malene Aambakk

Technical staff
 Head Coach: Heine Eriksen
 Assistant coach: Ole Jensen
 Team Leader: Dorthe Jonasson

Transfers
Transfers for the season 2023-24

Joining
  Alberte Ebler (RB) (from  Ikast Håndbold)

Leaving
  Nora Persson (GK)
  Thea Stankiewicz (LB) (to  IK Sävehof)
  Marielle Martinsen (CB) (to  Viborg HK)
  Malene Aambakk (RB) (retires)
  Stine Holm (RW)

Notable players 
 
 Louise Kristensen (2017-2018)
 Anne-Sofie Ernstrøm (2017-2019)
 Majbritt Toft Hansen (2017-2019)
 Simone Cathrine Petersen (2017-2019)
 Ditte Vind (2017-2019)
 Birna Berg Haraldsdóttir (2017-2019)
 Celine Holst Elkjær (2017-2019)
 Celine Lundbye Kristiansen (2018-2020)
 Julie Pontoppidan (2017-2020)
 Helena Elver (2018-2020)
 Sofie Flader (2017-2020)
 Edita Nukovic (2018-2020)

External links
The club's facebook 
Official website 

Sport in Aarhus
Danish handball clubs
Handball clubs established in 2017
2017 establishments in Denmark